Ubaldo Lanfranchi (died 19 June 1207) was an Italian Catholic archbishop.

A member of the noble Lanfranchi family, he was consecrated archbishop of Pisa on 11 April 1176. The primacy of the Pisan church extended to the ecclesiastical provinces of Torres, Cagliari and Arborea. On 21 March 1198 Innocent III confirmed his primacy over the Sardinian dioceses, traditionally linked to his seat since the time of Pope Urban II. 

In 1189 he participated in the Third Crusade, as papal legate accompanied by William I of Cagliari, reaching the Holy Land with 52 ships and sided with Guy of Lusignan, only to take the side of his rival Conrad of Monferrat; in the convulsive phases of the siege of Acre, he sanctioned the divorce between Humphrey IV of Toron and Queen Isabella of Jerusalem, so that she could marry Conrad. 

In the last three years of his life, however, Ubaldo entered into conflict with the Holy See due to some disputes over canon law in Sardinia, particularly in the Judicate of Logudoro. He died in 1207, probably on 19 June.

Legend
According to popular legend, it was he who returned from the siege of Tolemaide with the galleys laden with the land of Golgotha: in 1203 this "holy land" was spread on the ground where the Pisan monumental Camposanto arose.

References

Sources

12th-century births
1207 deaths
People from Pisa
Roman Catholic archbishops of Pisa